3.0  is the third  studio album by Japanese pop-rock band Chicago Poodle. It was released on 24 April 2013 by Giza Studio label.

Background
The album consists of two previously digitally released singles, such as Arifureta Kyou no Tokubetsu na Bamen and 1225 ~Kimi ga Ita Christmas~. Takaramono is the coupling song of their single Kimi no Egao ga Naniyori Sukidatta. The single itself is released in their next album Life Is Beautiful.

Charting
The album reached #73 rank in Oricon for first week and sold 1,342 copies. It charted only 1 week.

Track listing 
All the tracks has been arranged by Chicago Poodle.

In media
Kirameki Runner was used as commercial song for The Iyo Bank, Ltd.
Takaramono was used as image song for 100th anniversary of Megane Tanaka company

References 

Giza Studio albums
Being Inc. albums
Japanese-language albums
2013 albums
Chicago Poodle albums